This is a discography of composer, record producer and multi-instrumentalist  Vidyasagar.

Original scores

1980s

1990s

2000s

2010s

2020s

As singer

References

External links 
 Vidyasagar Official Website
 

Discography
Discographies of Indian artists